Pseudochazara hippolyte is a species of butterfly in the family Nymphalidae. It is confined from the southern Urals across Kazakhstan and northern Tian-Shan to Transbaikalia, Mongolia and northern Tibet. 
A similar species, formerly regarded as a subspecies of Pseudochazara hippolyte, but endemic from south of Spain, is Pseudochazara williamsi.

Description in Seitz
S. hippolyte Esp. (= alcyone F., agave Esp.) (43 b). Similar to the preceding [ S. autonoe ] in size and shape, but the distal band is on both wings broad, sharply defined and yellowish, being distally tinged with yellowish red. In the nymotypical form the hindwing beneath bears 3 distinct dentate lines, the ground-colour being often so darkened between the first two that there appears a dark median band. In Spain and South Russia as well as in Anterior Asia. — The form mercurius Stgr., from the Tian-shan district, has the bands brighter yellow, and in rhena H.-Schiff  , from Tokat, they have a strong orange tint. — On the other hand, Elwes found in the higher Altai a smaller form in which the bands are pure pale yellow, not being tinged with orange, but being traversed by the heavy dark veins; this is pallida Stgr. (43b), which is distinguished, moreover, by the underside of the hindwing being minutely but evenly irrorated with dust-grey. —
hippolyte is common in June and July at its flight-places, steppes and sterile meadow; it settles on naked places on the ground and flies only a short distance when disturbed, therefore being easy to catch (Elwes).

Flight period 
The species is univoltine and is on wing from July to August.

Food plants
Larvae feed on grasses.

Subspecies
Pseudochazara hippolyte hippolyte
Pseudochazara hippolyte doerriesi southern Siberia (Tuva region)
Pseudochazara hippolyte mercurius (Staudinger, 1887) northern Tian Shan, Dzhungarsky Alatau,  Saur and Tarbagatai

References

 Gil-T., F. (2017): Compared morphology and distribution of the taxa described of Pseudochazara williamsi (Romei, 1927) [= "Pseudochazara hippolyte" Esper from Spain]. Are they valid subspecies or only the result of phenotypic plasticity (ecological forms)? (Lepidoptera, Nymphalidae, Satyrinae). |ISSN 0171-0079| Atalanta vol. 48 (1-4): 188-196: 
 Satyrinae of the Western Palearctic - Pseudochazara hippolyte: 

Pseudochazara
Butterflies described in 1784